The 1969–70 Yorkshire Football League was the 44th season in the history of the Yorkshire Football League, a football competition in England. At the end of this season the league expanded up to three divisions.

Division One

Division One featured 14 clubs which competed in the previous season, along with four new clubs, promoted from Division Two:
Frecheville Community Association
Heeley Amateurs
Rawmarsh Welfare
Swallownest Miners Welfare

League table

Map

Division Two

Division Two featured eleven clubs which competed in the previous season, along with seven new clubs.
Clubs relegated from Division One:
Hamptons Sports
Hull Brunswick
Thorne Colliery
Plus:
Dinnington Athletic
Emley
Firth Vickers
North Ferriby United

League table

Map

League Cup

Final

References

1969–70 in English football leagues
Yorkshire Football League